Do the Collapse is the 11th album by Dayton, Ohio indie rock group Guided by Voices.  In contrast with their lo-fi reputation, the album features glossy production work from Ric Ocasek, which drew a mixed reception from critics and fans. "Hold On Hope" was covered by country singer Glen Campbell on his 61st album Ghost on the Canvas in 2011. In his introduction to James Greer's book Guided by Voices: A Brief History: Twenty-One Years of Hunting Accidents in the Forests of Rock and Roll, Academy Award-winning film maker Steven Soderbergh referenced the album stating "that album Ric Ocasek produced was terrific."

Critical reception 

AllMusic's Stephen Thomas Erlewine gave a negative review, giving the album 2 stars of 5. He criticized the album for having similar compositions of past releases despite major production differences, and considered the band to be lost musically speaking. He also believed the production didn't work with the tracks and resulted in the band creating an "overblown" sound which contrasted negatively with their indie aesthetics. Conversely, in a warmer review for NME, the album was praised as a “timeless, seamless, psychedelic folk-rock soul-quaver perfection to fall in love with life to”.

Accolades 
The track "Teenage FBI" was named the 160th on the "500 Greatest Modern Rock Song of All Time" by 97X in 2006.

In popular culture 

 featured on the soundtrack to the Buffy the Vampire Slayer TV-series.
 featured on NCAA Football 2006.
 featured on the Scrubs episode "My Occurrence" 
 featured on the 2000 film Attraction.

Track listing 
"Teenage FBI" – 2:53
"Zoo Pie" – 2:18
"Things I Will Keep" – 2:25
"Hold on Hope" – 3:31
"In Stitches" – 3:39
"Dragons Awake!" – 2:08
"Surgical Focus" – 3:48
"Optical Hopscotch" – 3:01
"Mushroom Art" – 1:47
"Much Better Mr. Buckles" – 2:24
"Wormhole" – 2:33
"Strumpet Eye" – 1:58
"Liquid Indian" – 3:38
"Wrecking Now" – 2:33
"Picture Me Big Time" – 4:01
"An Unmarketed Product" – 1:08

Personnel

Guided by Voices 
 Robert Pollard – lead vocals, guitar
 Doug Gillard – guitar, keyboard, backing vocals
 Greg Demos – bass guitar
 Jim Macpherson – drums

Additional musicians 
 Ariane Lallemand – cello
 Dylan Williams – viola
 David Soldier – string arrangements, violin
 Ric Ocasek – keyboards
 Brian Sperber – keyboards

Technical 
 Ric Ocasek – production, mixing, engineering
 Brian Sperber – engineer, mixing
 George Marino – mastering

References 

1999 albums
Guided by Voices albums
Albums produced by Ric Ocasek